Ramón Manulat (1930 – September 2019) was a Filipino basketball player. He was member of the Philippine National Team that won a gold medal at the 1954 Asian Games and a bronze medal at the 1954 FIBA World Championship. He also participated in the 1956 Summer Olympics, where his country placed seventh. Nationally, he played for the Manila Industrial and Commercial Athletic Association teams Seven-Up and Ysmael Steel.

Ramón Manulat was born to a Cuban-Spaniard father and a Filipino mother with roots to Leyte and Cebu. He grew up in Cebu and played for the Glowing Goldies of the University of Santo Tomas in Manila where he got a degree in mechanical engineering.

He was married to Maria Luisa Da Silva with whom he had three children. His family moved to Australia in 1971 and resided in Brisbane.

References

External links
 

1930 births
2019 deaths
Basketball players at the 1956 Summer Olympics
Olympic basketball players of the Philippines
Asian Games medalists in basketball
Basketball players at the 1954 Asian Games
Basketball players at the 1958 Asian Games
Philippines men's national basketball team players
Filipino men's basketball players
1959 FIBA World Championship players
Asian Games gold medalists for the Philippines
Medalists at the 1954 Asian Games
Medalists at the 1958 Asian Games
UST Growling Tigers basketball players
Filipino people of Spanish descent
Filipino people of Cuban descent
Filipino emigrants to Australia
1954 FIBA World Championship players
Place of birth missing
Date of birth missing
Date of death missing